Cry of Battle is a 1963 American coming-of-age war film based on the 1951 novel Fortress in the Rice by Benjamin Appel, who was a journalist and special assistant to the U.S. commissioner for the Philippines from 1945-46. The film stars Van Heflin, James MacArthur, Rita Moreno and Leopoldo Salcedo. Set during the Japanese occupation of the Philippines, the working title was To Be a Man.

Plot
The film begins on December 8, 1941 with the Japanese attacking the Philippines. Dave McVey Jr., the son of a rich American businessman with extensive holdings in the Philippines, is attacked by murderous bandits. He is rescued by Careo, a Filipino patriot who has put together a group of anti-Japanese Filipino guerrillas. Carero hides Dave with an elderly Filipino and his granddaughter, who teach Dave Tagalog.

Careo returns again to tell Dave that his father has left the Philippines, but Dave is joined by a fellow American, Joe Trent, a rough merchant sailor who was third mate on a cargo ship that was sunk by the Japanese. Joe's ship was part of a merchant line owned by Dave's father. Joe figures that Dave's father will reward him for keeping his son safe. Joe gets drunk and rapes the teenage granddaughter. When the girl starts screaming, Dave has no choice but to flee with Joe.

They meet a band of armed Filipinos led by Atong and the English-speaking woman Sisa. The quick-thinking Joe tells the band that if they bring them to Colonel Ryker, an American officer in charge of a guerrilla unit, Ryker will reward them. Ryker tells Dave that the Japanese would probably give him a comfortable existence and might repatriate him to the United States because of his father's extensive business dealings with Japan.  Dave replies that his father's connections to Japan were from before the war and he would rather fight with the guerrillas. The group joins Ryker's unit in fighting the Japanese.

Joe is promoted to lieutenant and is to accompany a Filipino captain on a raid against a Japanese-held sugar refinery and railway. Joe brings Dave, Atong, Sisa and a group of their original band on the mission. After the captain is killed, Atong kills one of his own men over the captain's pistol. Joe makes Atong give the pistol to Dave. Not wishing to complete their mission, Joe sends Dave and Sisa into a village to ask the locals for food.  As they are negotiating, Joe's band massacres the villagers to steal their rice, with Joe shooting Atong during the raid. Sisa quickly switches her loyalties to Joe.

Cast
 Van Heflin as Joe Trent
 Rita Moreno as Sisa
 James MacArthur as David McVey
 Leopoldo Salcedo as Manuel Careo
 Sidney Clute as Col. Ryker
 Marilou Muñoz as Pinang
 Oscar Roncal as Atong
 Liza Moreno as Vera
 Michael Parsons as Capt. Davis
 Claude Wilson as Matchek
 Vic Silayan as Capt. Garcia

Production
Producer Joe Steinberg had a wealthy brother named Harry Stonehill in the Philippines who assisted with the financing of the film. He hired his friends Irving Lerner to direct and Bernard Gordon to write the screenplay. Gordon saw the opportunity to use the screenplay as a comment on American attitudes toward Third World people and attitudes about masculinity, explaining the film's working title of To Be a Man. In the film, Dave asks Joe if raping his host's granddaughter made him feel like a man. Joe responds that fighting when necessary and having a woman when possible meant feeling like a man. Joe also initiates Dave into manhood by using his winnings in a poker game to give Dave a night with a prostitute. In Dave's first battle, he captures a panicked Japanese soldier, and Joe grabs Dave's hands and holds his rifle with bayonet, which he thrusts into the prisoner.

The film was shot in the Philippines. The visas were held up as the script was deemed offensive to Filipinos with vice-president Emmanuel Pelaez stating that the script "makes them the object of condescension and contempt" and was an "insult to the Filipino people"

Rita Moreno's scenes were shot around her travel to Hollywood to accept the Academy Award for Best Supporting Actress for West Side Story. A Filipino designed her dress for the awards ceremony, which Edith Head voted the most original of the night. The designer returned to the Philippines the next day.

Moreno's planned nude bathing scene in the film attracted a great deal of publicity. She eventually filmed the scene wearing a dress.

In popular culture
Cry of Battle and the 1961 film War Is Hell were playing as a double feature at the Texas Theatre in Dallas, Texas on November 22, 1963. After fatally shooting President John F. Kennedy and Dallas police officer J. D. Tippit earlier that afternoon, Lee Harvey Oswald sneaked into the theater without paying while War Is Hell was on the screen. After box office cashier Julia Postal was informed by shoe store employee John Brewer that a man had entered the theater, she called Dallas police. Despite attempting to shoot the arresting officer, Oswald was arrested. Oswald was fatally shot two days later by club owner Jack Ruby while being transferred to another jail.

Notes

External links
 
 
 
 

1963 films
1960s adventure drama films
1960s war drama films
Allied Artists films
American independent films
American war drama films
American black-and-white films
Films based on American novels
Films directed by Irving Lerner
Films set in 1941
Films set in the Philippines
Japanese occupation of the Philippines films
Pacific War films
American World War II films
Films shot in the Philippines
Films scored by Richard Markowitz
1963 drama films
1960s English-language films
1960s American films